Drumgoole is a surname. Notable people with the surname include:

George Drumgoole Coleman (1795–1844), Irish architect
Jenny Drumgoole, American video artist
John Christopher Drumgoole (1816–1888), Irish American Roman Catholic priest
Noel Drumgoole (1931–1995), Irish hurler

See also
Drumgoole Plaza, a park in Manhattan, New York